National Rugby Football League (NRFL) was a proposed professional rugby union league headquartered in Minneapolis, Minnesota. The NRFL originally planned to launch with 8 Founding Teams in major markets across North America in 2016. In April 2020, CEO Michael Clements announced a centralized ownership system in where all the clubs are owned by the league. The NRFL vetted founding members.

The NRFL was founded and run by a group of executives with experiences in aspects of professional sports industry, such as organizational formation, player development, legal, team operations, facility negotiations, technology, media and marketing.

History
The American investment group known as RugbyLaw worked to create the NRFL. That group was founded by Michael Clements.

More than 130 players, including nearly 50 with NFL experience, participated in the NRFL's first combine held in Minneapolis in April 2014. The second combine took place January 12–15 in Los Angeles, California at the LA Memorial Coliseum. Most of the players being courted to participate were former professional athletes from the NFL, NBA, and NHL.

An exhibition NRFL game was to be held between a team called the NRFL Rough Riders, composed of athletes identified at the two combines and international elite players, and the Leicester Tigers of the English Premiership. It was to have taken place on August 8, 2015 at Lincoln Financial Field in Philadelphia; however, the NRFL failed to apply for USA Rugby sanctioning, and therefore the match was cancelled. Another potential game involving 2015 Premiership champion Saracens was slated to be played against the Crusaders, a New Zealand Super Rugby franchise, in New Orleans. This match was also cancelled by the NRFL due to sanctioning, as World Rugby didn't OK the turf playing surface at Mercedes-Benz Superdome

Revamp

In April 2020, according to Forbes, CEO Michael Clements has said to partner with NFL Alumni, the retired players’ advocacy group for the world’s richest sports league, which plans to partner with the NRFL on a high-performance center for tackle-sport athletes.

Clements is starting a re-launch of the NRFL under a league-owned-and-operated model, replacing his former plan for individually owned franchises when the NRFL was first conceived in 2014. Currently funds are being raised with a targeted 2022 content launch followed by the Showcase Series, which leads into an 8 city-based league. The NRFL will compete in the U.S. with the existing Major League Rugby, which debuted in 2017. The NRFL will pull revenue from tickets and sponsorships.

Athletes
The National Rugby Football League in the past has held a series of regional and national combines in major metropolitan areas throughout the country. The combines produced some of the best rugby players and elite athletes in the nation. The NRFL targeted rugby "hotbeds" around the country to find talented athletes to develop into professional rugby players. A select group of athletes were chosen from these combines to begin their development to become a professional player in the NRFL.

References

External links
 

Rugby union leagues in the United States
Sports leagues established in 2014
2014 establishments in the United States
Proposed sports leagues